Roberto Magris & The D.I. Project: Music of Today is an album by jazz pianist Roberto Magris recorded in Germany and released on the Splasc(h) label in 1991, featuring performances by Magris with a German-Italian jazz ensemble.

Reception

The AllMusic review by Thom Jurek states: "Magris employs a group of mixed Europeans in charting his inner space where classical formalism meets post-hard bop jazz and free modalism. He writes from the point of view of sound first and then individual instrumentation, taking a macro view of the tonal and lyrical picture, and he succeeds magnificently."

Track listing
 The Way Inside (Roberto Magris) - 12:11 
 All The Mothers’ Love (Roberto Magris) - 2:19 
 Restless Spirits (Roberto Magris) - 16:02 
 Psico-estasi (Roberto Magris) - 7:23 
 Martin’s Jump (Roberto Magris) - 10:48

Personnel

Musicians
Martin Klingeberg – trumpet, vocal
Marco Castelli – tenor sax, soprano sax
Achim Goettert-Zadek – tenor sax, soprano sax
Joerg Drewing – trombone
Albrecht Riermeyer – vibraphone
Roberto Magris – piano
Rudi Engel – bass
Davide Ragazzoni – drums

Production
 Roberto Magris and Peppo Spagnoli – executive producer and producer
 Thomas Krueger – engineering
 Peppo Spagnoli – design

References

Roberto Magris albums
1991 albums